Buthoscorpio is a genus of scorpions in the family Buthidae.

Taxonomy 
There are five species recognised ed under the genus Buthoscorpio:
 Buthoscorpio chinnarensis Aswathi, Sureshan & Lourenço, 2015
 Buthoscorpio indicus Lourenço, 2012
 Buthoscorpio politus (Pocock, 1899)
 Buthoscorpio rayalensis Javed, Rao, Mirza, Sanap & Tampal, 2010
 Buthoscorpio sarasinorum (Karsch, 1891)

Distribution 
Species of this genus are found in India and Sri Lanka.

Description
Total length of the scorpion ranges from 30 to 52 mm. Sternum type 1 is subpentagonal or subtriangular and long, which exhibits horizontal compression. Pedipalps consists with tri-chobothrial pattern. Cheliceral fixed finger is with two ventral accessory denticles. Movable finger of pedipalp chela is longer than manus. Pectines are covered with fulcra. Tergites I to VI are smooth or finely granular, with one carina. Carapace smooth to finely granular without carinae. But, metasomal segments are punctate, without stridulatory areas. Telson vesicle is punctate, whereas subaculear tooth is absent or weakly developed. Pedipalps, metasoma and telson are glabrous.

References 

 Werner, 1936: « Neue-Eingänge von Skorpionen im Zoologischen Museum in Hamburg. Teil II. » Festschrift zum 60. Geburtstage von Professor Dr. Embrik Strand, 

Buthidae
Scorpion genera